Michele D. Perkins is an American university administrator, currently serving as the 15th president of New England College.

Education 
She completed a bachelor's degree in theatre and performance studies from Northwestern University. She then earned a master's degree in communication from Emerson College. Perkins completed a doctorate in education in higher education management from University of Pennsylvania.

Career 
Perkins taught speech and drama at Emerson College and Curry College. She worked in admissions and enrollment management at White Pines College, New York Law School, Trinity College, and Emerson College.

Perkins has worked as an independent consultant on admissions marketing strategies and long-range planning. She is a co-founder of the NAGAP. Perkins joined New England College in 2001 as the vice president for enrollment. She became the senior vice president two years later. Perkins was appointed president in 2007.

Personal life 
Perkins resides in Henniker, New Hampshire with her husband and son.

References

Year of birth missing (living people)
Living people
Heads of universities and colleges in the United States
New England College faculty
Emerson College alumni
Emerson College faculty
Northwestern University alumni
University of Pennsylvania Graduate School of Education alumni
Curry College faculty
New York Law School faculty
Trinity College (Connecticut) faculty
American women academics
Women heads of universities and colleges
21st-century American women